Krk is the main settlement of the island of Krk, Croatia.

Characteristics

It is located on the southwest coast of the island and is the historical seat of the Roman Catholic Diocese of Krk.

The city is ancient, being among the oldest in the Adriatic Sea. It has been continuously inhabited since ancient times including the Illyrians and later the Romans, and was once part of the Byzantine Theme Dalmatia after the Western Roman Empire had fallen to the barbarians.

Roman ruins can be seen today in some parts of the town, for example mosaics in the houses. The city had also preserved many medieval fortifications, including Frankopan Castle close to the Kamplin park, and part of the city walls built during the five centuries when the Republic of Venice ruled the city.

The main square of the old city is called Kamplin: which is derived from the Latin word "campus", meaning field. During Roman times, a training area was located here close to the thermal Roman spas. The remnants of the temple columns at the square gives witness to a large building from Roman times.

In the 13th century one of the "cadet branches" of the aristocratic Italian Frangipani family settled in the city and gave rise to the Croatian family of the Frankopan. Krk was the last Croatian island to be occupied by the Venetians. Krk and surrounding area were known for large use of glagoljica. In the 19th century the city was center of the Illyrian movement.

The city was once known for its unique Romance language called Vegliotic (one of the two main branches of the extinct Dalmatian language), which was spoken until the early 19th century.
There was a large Italian community in the city, but Italy eventually gave up the island in favor of Yugoslavia in 1921 (when the city was officially called Krk for the first time), and many of its Italian-speaking residents subsequently left for Istria and  Italy.

The city was temporarily occupied by D'Annunzio in 1921 and twenty years later was integrated into the Italian Province of Fiume between 1941 and 1943. Josip Broz Tito's Partisans liberated the city in 1944.

There it is still a small indigenous Italian community, represented within the "Unione Italiana" of Croatia.

Demographics

Gallery

References

External links 

 Cultural Monuments
 Krk (town) official Website
 Krk (town) Tourist Board

Krk
Cities and towns in Croatia
Populated coastal places in Croatia
Populated places in Primorje-Gorski Kotar County
Seaside resorts in Croatia
Illyrian Croatia